Aspakhu (also Romanized as Aspākhū, Espākhū, and Asbākhū) is a village in Almeh Rural District, Samalqan District, Maneh and Samalqan County, North Khorasan Province, Iran. At the 2006 census, its population was 340, in 76 families.

References 

Populated places in Maneh and Samalqan County